Sela pri Hinjah is a village in the Municipality of Žužemberk in southeastern Slovenia. The area is part of the historical region of Lower Carniola. The municipality is now included in the Southeast Slovenia Statistical Region.

Church

The local church is dedicated to Saint George and belongs to the Parish of Hinje. It was built in 1901.

References

External links
Sela pri Hinjah at Geopedia

Populated places in the Municipality of Žužemberk